Kevin Wade Batiste (born October 21, 1966) is an American former professional baseball player. Batiste played for the Toronto Blue Jays in 1989.

He was drafted by the Blue Jays in the 2nd round of the 1985 amateur draft.

External links

1966 births
Living people
African-American baseball players
American expatriate baseball players in Canada
Baseball players from Texas
Dunedin Blue Jays players
Florence Blue Jays players
Greenville Braves players
Knoxville Blue Jays players
Major League Baseball left fielders
Major League Baseball right fielders
Medicine Hat Blue Jays players
Sportspeople from Galveston, Texas
Syracuse Chiefs players
Toronto Blue Jays players
Ventura County Gulls players
21st-century African-American people
20th-century African-American sportspeople